Gmina Chrzanów is an urban-rural gmina (administrative district) in Chrzanów County, Lesser Poland Voivodeship, in southern Poland.

Overview

The gmina contains part of the protected area called Tenczynek Landscape Park.

Villages
Apart from the town of Chrzanów, Gmina Chrzanów contains the villages and settlements of Balin, Luszowice, Płaza and Pogorzyce.

Neighbouring gminas
Gmina Chrzanów is bordered by the city of Jaworzno and by the gminas of Alwernia, Babice, Libiąż and Trzebinia.

External links
Polish official population figures 2006

Chrzanow
Chrzanów County